Günəşli is a village and municipality in the Saatly Rayón of Azerbaijan.

Description 
It has a population of 1,276.

References

Populated places in Saatly District